Helianthus deserticola, the desert sunflower, is a plant species native to Arizona, Nevada and Utah.

Helianthus deserticola is a daughter species of the species Helianthus annuus and Helianthus petiolaris.

Flower heads contain approximately 7-13 ray flowers and more than 25 disc flowers.

References

deserticola
Flora of the Southwestern United States
Plants described in 1960